The United Nationalities Federal Council (abbreviated UNFC) is a coalition of five opposition groups in Myanmar. In 2011, the council was formed by 11 opposition groups that campaigns for the rights of various ethnic minorities in Myanmar. Six of the UNFC's members have successfully made or are in the process of making peace negotiations and permanent ceasefire agreements with the government. The group's armed wing is the Federal Union Army (FUA).

Membership
The UNFC currently has five members.

Ceasefire members
 Chin National Front (suspended in November 2015)
 Karen National Union (resigned in September 2014)
 Karenni Army
 Lahu Democratic Union
 New Mon State Party
 Pa-O National Organization (suspended in November 2015)
 Shan State Army - North

Non-ceasefire members
 Arakan Army 
 Kachin Independence Army (resigned in May 2017)
 Ta'ang National Liberation Army (resigned in 2016)
 Wa National Organisation (resigned in May 2017)

Leadership
 Chief: Nai Hong Sar (NMSP)
 Vice-chief: Naing Han Tha (NMSP)
 Secretary: Khu Oo Yel (KNPP)
 Co-secretary: U Tun Zaw (ANC)

References

External links
 UNFC website 

History of Myanmar (1948–present)
Internal conflict in Myanmar
Political party alliances in Myanmar
Politics of Myanmar
Rebel groups in Myanmar